Jean-Étienne Despréaux (31 August 1748 – 26 March 1820) was a French ballet dancer, choreographer, composer, singer and playwright.

Biography 
The son of an oboist of the orchestra of the Académie royale de musique, he made here his début in 1763, four years after his brother Claude-Jean-François.

A remarkable dancer for his lightness in the high dance, he was applauded in several ballets :
1771: Pyramus and Thisbe, by La Serre, Rebel and Francœur
1773: Les Amours de Ragonde, by Destouches and Mouret
1774: Iphigénie en Aulide, by Du Roullet and Gluck
1774: Sabinus, by Chabanon and Gossec
1778: La Chercheuse d'esprit, a ballet by Maximilien Gardel.

He retired in 1781 with a 1,000 livres pension and married the famous ballerina Marie-Madeleine Guimard on 14 August 1789.

Charles-Maurice Descombes, in his 1856 Histoire anecdotique du théâtre, writes:

Works 
Despréaux wrote several parodies of operas that Louis XV particularly appreciated.

 1777: Berlingue, parody of Ernelinde by Sedaine and Philidor
 1778: Momie, parody of Iphigénie en Aulide by Gluck
 1778: Romans, parody of Roland by Quinault and Lully
 1780: Christophe et Pierre-Luc, parody of Castor et Pollux by Gentil Bernard and Rameau
 1786: Syncope, reine de Mic-Mac, parody of Pénélope by Cimarosa
 1801: Jenesaiki, ou les Exaltés de Charenton, parody of Béniovski ou les Exilés du Kamchattka by Boieldieu
 1801: La Tragédie au vaudeville, en attendant le vaudeville à la tragédie, parody of Othello by Jean-François Ducis

He also made the opening prologue for the Théâtre de la Reine in May 1780.

But he is mostly known as the author of Mes passe-temps : chansons, suivies de l'Art de la danse, poème en quatre chants, calqué sur l'''Art poétique de Boileau Despréaux, seminal work for choreography considered as an art in itself, and not as mere entertainment.

 References 

 Bibliography 
 Jacques-Alphonse Mahul, Annuaire nécrologique, ou Supplément annuel et continuation de toutes les biographies ou dictionnaires historiques, 1e année, 1820, Paris : Baudoin , 1821, (p. 82–83) 
 Émile Campardon, L’Académie royale de musique au XVIIIe'', Paris, Berger-Levrault et Cie, 1884, vol. I, (p. 245–247).

External links 
 Jean-Étienne Despréaux on Data.bnf.fr
 His plays on CÉSAR

1748 births
1820 deaths
Musicians from Paris
French male singers
18th-century French ballet dancers
French male ballet dancers
18th-century French dramatists and playwrights
18th-century French poets
18th-century French male writers